was a baseball player for the Japanese Professional Baseball league. He played in the Japan Pacific League and the Korea Baseball Organization.

His brother Yusaku is also a former baseball player.

Iriki was born on 3 June 1967, and died in a traffic collision on 10 February 2023.  He was involved in a frontal collision while driving his personal vehicle near his hometown. Iriki was rushed to the hospital where he died 2 hours later. Death was attributed to massive head injuries. He was 55 years old.

References

1967 births
2023 deaths
Baseball people from Miyazaki Prefecture
Nippon Professional Baseball pitchers
Kintetsu Buffaloes players
Hiroshima Toyo Carp players
Yomiuri Giants players
Yakult Swallows players
Japanese expatriate baseball players in South Korea
Doosan Bears players
Japanese expatriate baseball players in Taiwan
La New Bears players
Road incident deaths in Japan